James Henry Digby "Bungy" Watson (31 August 1890 – 15 October 1914) was an English rugby union player. He won 3 caps for England, all in the 1914 Five Nations Championship. He was killed while serving as a surgeon aboard  when it was torpedoed and sunk by U-9 in 1914 during World War I, and is commemorated on the Chatham Naval Memorial.

Early life
Watson was born on 31 August 1890 at Southsea to Eliza V. Watson and her husband Captain James Herbert Watson, an engineer in the Royal Navy. He attended The King's School, Canterbury from September 1899 to April 1906, and played for the First XV in 1905. He then transferred to Edinburgh Academy for his final two years of schooling, playing for the First XV there too. There he earned his nickname "Bungy" after using the King's Canterbury term for a rubber, which was unknown at the Academy. He then studied medicine at the University of Edinburgh from 1908 to 1913, graduating Bachelor of Medicine, Bachelor of Surgery. At University, he played for the University Rugby XV, and was also the University middleweight boxing champion.

Rugby career

International appearances

Military service

At the start of the World War I, Watson was appointed Surgeon in the Royal Navy aboard HMS Hawke. The ship was part of the Northern Patrol, and on 15 October 1914, Hawke and HMS Theseus were patrolling in the North Sea, 60 miles off Aberdeen when a torpedo launched by the German submarine U-9 struck the Hawke amidships. The impact detonated the ship's magazine and caused two large explosions. The ship sank quickly with the loss of 525 men, including Watson.

He is commemorated on the Chatham Naval Memorial, at Twickenham war memorial, and at Blackheath.

See also
 List of international rugby union players killed in action during the First World War

References

Bibliography

External links

1890 births
1914 deaths
English rugby union players
England international rugby union players
British military personnel killed in World War I
English surgeons
People educated at Edinburgh Academy
Alumni of the University of Edinburgh
20th-century surgeons
Rugby union players from Portsmouth